Per Nilsson  may refer to:

Per Nilsson (gymnast) (1890–1964), Swedish gymnast
Per Nilsson (footballer) (born 1982), Swedish football (soccer) player
Per Nilsson (guitarist) in the bands Scar Symmetry and Kaipa
Per Nilsson (writer) (born 1954), Swedish writer

also see
Per Nielsen, Danish football (soccer) player